A dialyte lens (sometimes called a dialyt) is a compound lens design that corrects optical aberrations where the lens elements are widely air-spaced. The design is used to save on the amount of glass used for specific elements or where elements can not be cemented because they have dissimilar curvatures. The word dialyte means "parted", "loose" or "separated".

Dialyte telescopes
The idea of widely separating the color correcting elements of a lens dates back to W. F. Hamilton's  1814 catadioptric Hamiltonian telescope and Alexander Rogers' 1828 proposals for a dialytic refractor. The goal was to combine a large crown glass objective with a much smaller flint glass downstream to make an achromatic lens since flint glass at that time was very expensive. Dialyte designs were also used in the Schupmann medial telescope designed by in German optician Ludwig Schupmann near the end of the 19th century, in John Wall's 1999 "Zerochromat" retrofocally corrected dialytic refractor and the Russian made "TAL Apolar125" telescope which uses 6 elements arranged in three widely separated groups.

Dialyte camera lenses
There are many types of dialyte camera lenses. One type is a symmetrical design consisting of four air spaced lenses: the outer pair is biconvex and the inner pair is biconcave. The symmetrical structure provides good correction for many aberrations.

The Aviar type of lens (Taylor Hobson) is similar but is considered to have a different origin, from the splitting of the central biconcave element of the Cooke triplet. The resulting two biconcave elements are closer together than in the Dialyte/Celor design.

See also
 List of telescope types.

References

Photographic lenses